The Orange Line is a rapid transit line in Chicago, Illinois, operated by the Chicago Transit Authority as part of the Chicago "L" system. As of 2021, an average of 11,006 riders board Orange Line trains on weekdays.

Route

The Orange Line begins in an open cut at a station on the east side of Midway International Airport. From here, the line rises to an elevated viaduct at 55th Street and continues northeast towards the city on railroad right-of-way. Near the intersection of 49th Street and Lawndale Avenue, the line turns east along a CSX right-of-way to a point east of Western Boulevard, then curves north and northwest on embankment structure along CSX right-of-way to Western Boulevard and Pershing Road.

From here, the line rises on elevated structure again and makes a curve to cross Archer Avenue, the CSX tracks and Western Boulevard before descending onto Illinois Central Railroad right-of-way immediately east of Western Boulevard. Entering the IC right-of-way, the line again changes from elevated structure to surface level. The line continues on surface level to Ashland Avenue where it crosses a bridge over the South Branch of the Chicago River. At this point, the line enters the joint Illinois Central and Atchison, Topeka and Santa Fe Railroad right-of-way continuing on embankment to Canal Street.

There the line again transitions to the elevated structure to bridge Canal Street, Cermak Road and the Chicago & Western Indiana Railroad tracks then curves east to run along the south side of 18th Street, crossing over the Red Line and the Rock Island District tracks near Wentworth Avenue, before joining the South Side Elevated at a flying junction between 16th and 17th Streets. The ballasted track ends and the timber deck begins here. Orange Line trains share the tracks with the Green Line operating from this junction to Tower 12 at the southeast corner of the Loop. Orange Line trains operate clockwise around the inner loop - via Van Buren Street, Wells Street, Lake Street and Wabash Avenue - before returning to Midway.

Along the Orange Line's main route there are seven stations. An eighth station is located at Roosevelt/Wabash on the South Side Elevated which Orange Line trains share with Green Line trains. A passenger tunnel connects this station with the Roosevelt/State subway station on the Red Line.

A downtown superstation was proposed to provide express service from the Loop to O'Hare and Midway, via the Orange and Blue Lines, but the project was cancelled during the excavation process due to significant cost overruns.

Operating hours and headways
The Orange Line operates between Midway and the Loop weekdays from 3:30 a.m. to 1:25 a.m., Saturdays from 4 a.m. to 1:30 a.m. and Sundays from 4:30 a.m. to 1:25 a.m. On weekdays, headways consists of 10tph (trains per hour) during rush hour, 8tph during midday and 5tph at night. Saturday service consists 5-8tph during the day, then 3-4tph during late night hours. Sunday service runs 5tph during the day, then 3-4 tph at night.

During morning rush hour, several Orange Line trains bound for the Loop continue toward the Brown Line after stopping at Adams/Wabash station; whereas several Brown Line trains bound for Midway continue as the Orange Line after stopping at Harold Washington Library station.

Rolling stock
The Orange Line is operated with the 2600-series cars. From November 8, 2012 to October 31, 2014, some 2400-series railcars were assigned to the line. From the opening of the route to October 2018, 3200-series railcars were assigned to the line. Trains operate using eight cars during weekday rush hours and four cars during other times on weekdays and all day on weekends except for special events when eight cars may be required.

Beginning in June 2014, CTA began to transfer some 2600-series cars to the line as an interim replacement for its 2400-series cars. The first batch of the Orange Line's 2600-series cars are reassignments from the Blue Line, where the lost capacity on the Blue Line is made up from reassignment of 2600-series cars from the Red Line, which are newer than the existing Blue Line cars, as they are displaced by the new Bombardier-built 5000-series cars on the Red Line. The second batch of 2600-series cars are reassignments from the Red Line as more 5000-series cars are delivered and assigned to the Red Line, replacing the Orange Line's remaining 2400-series cars until the Red Line is fully equipped with the 5000-series cars. The last 2400-series cars were retired from service in October 2014. 

After the Red Line is fully equipped with the 5000-series cars, the CTA planned on replacing the Orange Line's 2600-series cars with the 5000-series cars, leaving only the Blue and Brown Lines as the only lines not to operate the 5000-series cars. However, the assignment of 5000-series cars to the Orange Line is now unlikely, since delivery of all 5000-series cars is complete and are completely assigned to all other lines except for the Blue and Brown Lines, thus the assignment of 2600-series cars to the Orange Line is now a permanent assignment until the delivery of the new 7000-series cars.

Beginning September 2018, CTA began to transfer the Orange Line's 3200-series cars to the Blue Line. As of October 2018, the 3200-series cars no longer operate on the Orange Line.

History

The Orange Line opened for service on October 31, 1993, and was the first all-new service in Chicago since the Dan Ryan Line opened in September 1969 and the first extension to the CTA system since the O'Hare Airport Extension of the Blue Line in September 1984. But its planning dates back to the late 1930s when the City of Chicago proposed a high speed subway extension along Wells-Archer-Cicero between the Loop and 63rd Street and Cicero Avenue near Chicago Midway International Airport (then called Chicago's Municipal Airport). It would be another four decades before Chicago transit planners became serious about providing rapid transit service to this area of the city.

In 1979, the City began the Southwest Transit Project, which proposed extending the CTA 'L' system to the Southwest Side of Chicago over existing railroad rights-of-way and newer elevated connections along the very busy Archer-49th-Cicero Corridor from the Loop to its originally planned terminus at Ford City Shopping Center. Funding for the project was made possible from Interstate Highway Transfer monies saved after the city decided to cancel the high priced and controversial Crosstown Expressway and Franklin Street subway projects. Federal funding for the project was secured by U.S. Representative William Lipinski as a favor from then-President Ronald Reagan, who wanted to thank Lipinski for his vote to provide aid to the Nicaraguan contras.

In 1987, construction of the $500 million transit line began and continued until fall 1993. When the Midway Line opened, the CTA decided to adopt a color-coded naming system for the rapid transit network (like Boston, Washington D.C. and Cleveland) and named it the Orange Line.

Former proposed extension

Destination signs on CTA trains have a line bearing Ford City. The Ford City Mall is about two miles (3 km) south of Midway Airport, and it was originally planned to be the line's terminal. However, because of financial shortfalls, the city decided to end the line at Midway Airport.

The CTA analyzed the cost of an Orange Line extension to Ford City in 2008 and determined that the project would cost approximately $200 million. Community meetings were held in neighborhoods surrounding Midway and Ford City to judge the level of public support for the extension.

The four corridors being studied for the Orange Line extension include alignments along Cicero Avenue, Pulaski Road, and a combination of the Belt Railway and either Cicero or Kostner Avenues. The corridors selected for further study are Cicero Ave (Bus Rapid Transit) and Belt/Cicero or Belt/Kostner (Heavy Rail Transit). In April 2009, the Cicero Avenue/Belt Railway corridor was chosen as the most viable option and advanced in the Alternatives Analysis process. By December 2009, the CTA had identified the Locally Preferred Alternative (LPA) as the Belt/Cicero route. According to a CTA report,

The CTA planned to prepare a draft Environmental Impact Statement (EIS) and complete preliminary engineering. However, the extension was canceled.

Station listing

After stopping at Adams/Wabash, Orange Line trains return to Roosevelt, then make all stops back to Midway.

References

External links

 Orange Line at CTA official site
Orange Line extension plan

Chicago Midway
Midway International Airport
 
Railway lines in Chicago
Railway lines opened in 1993
1993 establishments in Illinois